Menna Allah Samy El-Fadali (born 4 September 1983) is an Egyptian actress and singer born in 1983. Menna participated in cinema in many of the movies starting with the film El Basha telmiz with Karim Abdel Aziz and Ghada Adel and then "Youth Spicy," "Ghost," and "Vacuum Killer", and "There is No Usefulness" and "Karaoke" and "light eyes" and "The Dealer".

Career
Menna Fadali studied tourism and hospitality, but dropped her studies as she began acting, when she was presented by her mother, who was working as an assistant director to director Majdi Abu Amira, who was impressed by her and assigned her a role in the series Ayana Kalby in 2002. In the following year, Menna participated in the series ‘People in Kafr Askar’ directed by Nader Galal, and in the same year in the series ‘Hamza and five daughters’.

Menna participated in the series 3afaryt Al Siala in 2004 with a lot of stars. Her role was considered a turning point in her acting career, followed by many series such as "It's time," and "market Gravel" Bird Love ", and" El Hilali, "with the star," Yehia El-Fakharany ", and" el malek Farouk, " in which she played a unique role as the Queen, also had a series of" October the other, "and the comedy series" The Thief and the book ".

Filmography
 El-Shabah
 El Dealer
 Mako (2019)

Series
 Regheef El-Esh
 Nafeza Ala El-Alam
 Mowaten Bedaraget Wazzir
 Lel Tharwa Hisabat Ukhra
 Aan El-Awan
 Qalb Emra'a
 Lahazat Harega
 Mafesh Fayda
 Sekket EL-Hilali
 El Malek Farouk
 El-Les Wal-Kitab
 Wesh Tany
 L'excellence – 2014

Songs
 Masria Ana (I am Egyptian)

References

1983 births
21st-century Egyptian women singers
Egyptian film actresses
Egyptian television actresses
Living people